The carry operator, symbolized by the ¢ sign,  is an abstraction of the operation of determining whether a portion of an adder network generates or propagates a carry. It is defined as follows:
 ¢

External links
 http://www.aoki.ecei.tohoku.ac.jp/arith/mg/algorithm.html

Computer arithmetic